Euseius alterno is a species of mite in the family Phytoseiidae.

References

alterno
Articles created by Qbugbot
Animals described in 2001